Bandar laddu is a sweet produced in Machilipatnam of Krishna district in the Indian state of Andhra Pradesh. It was registered as one of the geographical indication from Andhra Pradesh on 3 May 2017, under foodstuff by Geographical Indication Registry.

References 

Geographical indications in Andhra Pradesh
Textile arts of India
Krishna district